Gillmeria vesta is a moth of the family Pterophoridae. It is found in the Russian Far East.

References

Moths described in 1996
Platyptiliini
Endemic fauna of Russia
Moths of Asia